Classic FM TV was a television channel owned by British radio station Classic FM. Until 14 December 2007 it was available as a television channel on the Sky Digital satellite and Virgin Media cable TV services. After that, Classic FM TV only broadcast online in the United Kingdom via the Internet.

It claimed itself as the world’s first classical music television channel with programming consisting of soft and relaxing classical music videos 24-hours a day.

The channel was removed from Sky and Virgin Media on 14 December 2007. It also become online-only.
On 17 December 2007 a new channel called oMusic TV launched on Sky in Classic FM TV's slot.

Other media 
Classic FM TV was the sister station of UK radio station Classic FM. Classic FM also publishes a monthly magazine, Classic FM Magazine.

Ownership 
The satellite channel was owned by GCap Media.

References

External links
 
 
 

GCap Media
Classical music in the United Kingdom
Television channels and stations disestablished in 2007
Classic FM (UK)